A list of films produced in the United Kingdom in 1989 (see 1989 in film):

1989

See also
1989 in British music
1989 in British radio
1989 in British television
1989 in the United Kingdom

References

External links

1989
Films
British